Water polo competitions at the 2015 Pan American Games in Toronto was held from July 7 to 15 at the Markham Pan Am Centre in Markham. The water polo competitions was the first sporting event to be conducted at the games, beginning three days before the opening ceremony. This is because the Pan American Games were scheduled to be held roughly around the same time as the 2015 World Aquatics Championships scheduled for Kazan, Russia, thus the competition was moved forward to allow for a sufficient gap between the two events. A total of eight men's and women's teams competed in each respective tournament.

The winner of the men's tournament (the United States) qualified for the 2016 Summer Olympics in Rio de Janeiro, Brazil.

Venue

The competitions took place at the Atos Markham Pan Am Centre (Markham Pan Am Centre) located in the city of Markham, about 31 kilometers from the athletes village. The arena had a capacity of 2,000 people per session (1,000 permanent seating + 1,000 temporary seats). The venue was also host the badminton and table tennis competitions, but in the other side of the centre (a triple gymnasium).

Competition schedule
The following is the competition schedule for the water polo competitions:

Medal table

Medalists

Qualification
A total of eight men's teams and eight women's qualified to compete at the games. The top three teams at the South American Championship and Central American and Caribbean Games qualified for each respective tournament. Venezuela and Colombia who compete in both events, were not eligible to qualify through the latter. The host nation (Canada) and the United States automatically qualified teams in both events. Each nation could enter one team in each tournament (13 athletes per team) for a maximum total of 26 athletes.

Men

For unknown reasons, Puerto Rico withdrew from the men's tournament and was replaced with Ecuador.

Women

Participating nations
A total of nine countries qualified water polo teams. The numbers in parenthesis represents the number of participants entered.

References

 
Events at the 2015 Pan American Games
2015
Pan American Games
2015